Calathotarsus simoni is a species of spider in the family Migidae, found in Argentina. Typical to the trapdoor families of spiders, rather than build nests, this spider creates burrows hidden by a door constructed of nearby detritus camouflaging its location.

References

Migidae
Spiders of Argentina
Spiders described in 1975